Pierre Drouguet (Verviers, 2 May 1962) is a former Belgian football goalkeeper.

Honours

Player

RFC Liège 

 Belgian League Cup: 1986
 Belgian Cup: 1986-87 (runners-up)

KV Mechelen 
 Belgian First Division: 1988–89
 European Cup Winners Cup: 1987–88 (winners)
 European Super Cup: 1988

References

External links
 

Living people
1962 births
People from Verviers
Association football goalkeepers
Belgian footballers
RFC Liège players
K.V. Mechelen players
K.V. Kortrijk players
Beerschot A.C. players
KFC Turnhout players
R.C.S. Verviétois players
Belgian Pro League players
Footballers from Liège Province